Islam Salah (born 1 July 1991 or 7 January 1991) is an Egyptian footballer who plays for Al Masry as a centre-back.

References

1991 births
Living people
Egyptian footballers
Egyptian Premier League players
Association football defenders
Al Masry SC players
El Dakhleya SC players